Abram Nteo (born 15 July 1977) is a South African former footballer. He competed in the men's tournament at the 2000 Summer Olympics.

References

External links
 
 

1977 births
Living people
South African soccer players
Olympic soccer players of South Africa
Footballers at the 2000 Summer Olympics
People from Matjhabeng Local Municipality
Association football midfielders
Soccer players from the Free State (province)
Bloemfontein Celtic F.C. players